The green beret was the official headdress of the British Commandos of the Second World War. It is still worn by members of the Royal Marines after passing the Commando Course, and personnel from other units of the Royal Navy, Army and RAF who serve within 3 Commando Brigade and who have passed the All Arms Commando Course.

There are certain other military organizations that also wear the green beret because they have regimental or unit histories that have a connection with the British Commandos of the Second World War. These include the Australian, French and Dutch commandos. It is the norm in the armed forces of the Commonwealth Nations, where most regiments wear headdresses and cap badges which reflect regimental history and traditions.

Origins

Initially, those who joined the British Commandos kept their parent regimental headdress and cap badges. In 1941, No. 1 Commando had no fewer than 79 different cap badges and many different forms of headdress. "Thus a motley collection of caps, Tam o' Shanters, bonnets, forage caps, caps 'fore and aft', berets, peaked KD caps, etc., appeared on the Commando parades," says Captain Oakley, "the forest being a veritable RSM’s nightmare!"

No. 2 Commando and  No. 9 Commando faced with the same problem had adopted the Tam o' Shanter, but, as a traditional Scottish headdress, this was not considered suitable for what was a British unit. After some discussion it was agreed that if No. 1 Commando was to adopt a uniformed headdress then the beret, which had been worn by the Tank Regiment since the First World War (and had recently been adopted by the Parachute Regiment), would meet the requirements: it had no British regional affinity, it was difficult to wear improperly, and it could be easily stowed away without damage (when for example tin hats were in use).

Having decided on the headdress, the next question to be resolved was the colour. The shoulder insignia of No. 1 Commando had been designed by the Richmond Herald at the College of Arms. It incorporated three colours in its design of a green salamander going through fire: red, yellow and green. Green was chosen as the most suitable. A Scottish firm of tam-o-shanter makers in Irvine (Ayrshire) was chosen to design and manufacture the beret.

Once the design was agreed, Brigadier Robert Laycock was approached by No. 1 Commando to seek his permission to wear it. He had been pondering on what the commandos should use for their headdress, and welcomed the green beret as a chance to introduce it as standard for all commandos formations, with No. 1 Commando being the first to don them.

The proposal that the commandos should start wearing green beret as their official headdress was submitted to the Chief of Combined Operations and forwarded by Lord Mountbatten to the Under-Secretary of State for War. Approval was granted and in October 1942 the first green berets were issued to the Royal Marines.

Australian commandos
Australian Commando berets are known as being "Sherwood Green" in colour. The corps badge on the beret is a black background and a gold combat dagger with the motto "Foras Admonitio" meaning "Without Warning" across the dagger. The green beret is only awarded to a soldier upon becoming qualified as a Commando in either of the below regiments. 
1st Commando Regiment
2nd Commando Regiment. Formerly 4th Battalion, Royal Australian Regiment, a special forces unit of the Australian Army

Belgian paracommandos
Consisting of two battalions within the light brigade, only the 2nd Commando Battalion inherited the green beret along with other traditions from the 4th Troop of No.10 Commando. These paracommandos are the only "green berets" that are no longer a special operations force, but are considered to be elite. However, the Belgian special forces usually only recruits from paracommandos.

Dutch commandos
The Special Forces of the Netherlands consist mainly of the KCT (Korps Commando Troepen). Their motto is "Nunc aut Nunquam" which is Latin for "Now or Never". The roots of the KCT go back to World War II. Under the name No. 2 (Dutch) Troop, the first Dutch commandos were trained in Achnacarry, Scotland, as part of No. 10 (Inter-Allied) Commando. The unit was formed on March 22, 1942, the birthday of the present KCT.

Members of the Royal Netherlands Marine Corps also receive upon completion of the Commando Course a green beret, but with the gold anchor on a red background.

Finnish Coastal Jaegers

The Finnish Coastal Jaegers primary role is to conduct counter attacks against enemy landings in the Finnish archipelago, an environment known for small islands and skerries. Jaegers can function independently or with the support of artillery units, including light or heavy mortars. A number of Coastal Jaeger troops receive training for unconventional warfare and reconnaissance behind enemy lines.
 
The right to wear the green beret must be earned & can be lost as a punishment.

French commandos

The Commandos Marine are an elite special operations unit of the French Navy. Formed from Fusiliers Marins during the Second World War in Britain, they wear the same green berets, pulled right, as the British Commandos. They are called bérets verts (green berets).

Italian Navy's Special Forces

The COMSUBIN are the elite special operations unit of the Italian Navy. The Royal Italian Navy's Naval Assault Divisions is considered to be the precursor of modern Naval Special Forces. They are called baschi verdi (green berets).

Lithuanian military
Green berets are worn by soldiers of most of the Lithuanian Armed Forces with exception of the Military Police, Navy, Air Force, the Volunteer Forces, SOF and the Engineer Battalion.

Mexican Army Special Forces Corps

The Mexican Army Special Forces nicknamed the COIFE, formerly the GAFE (Grupo Aeromóvil de Fuerzas Especiales), are a special operations unit of the Mexican Army. The COIFE adapted the green beret as their signature headgear, known as the boina verde (Spanish for green beret). The COIFE have received training from Israeli and American special forces. The COIFE have also played a key role against Mexican drug cartels during the on-going Mexican drug war. They are the Mexican Army's equivalent to the U.S. Army Special Forces.

Portuguese Paratroopers 

The Portuguese Paratroopers (Portuguese: Tropas Paraquedistas) are an elite infantry assault force, representing the bulk of the airborne forces of Portugal. They were created in 1956 as part of the Portuguese Air Force, being transferred to the Portuguese Army in 1993. Presently, most of the Paratroopers are part of the Portuguese Rapid Reaction Brigade which comprises all 3 special forces troops.

The Portuguese Paratroopers were usually nicknamed "Paras" or "Green Berets" (Boinas Verdes).

Portuguese Special Operations (Army Rangers) 

The unit members wear a moss/dry green beret and are the heir of the Special Hunters: the beret badge includes a hunting horn—a symbol of the Special Hunters; and the unit is known as Rangers because the first instructors of the Special Hunters completed the Ranger Course and adapted the characteristics of that training to the Special Operations Course. This special forces unit has operated in Bosnia and Herzegovina, East-Timor, Kosovo, Afghanistan, and Iraq.

Royal Marine Commandos

 
In the United Kingdom all Royal Marines who have passed the Commando Course wear the green beret.  Personnel from the Royal Navy, British Army, and Royal Air Force volunteering for service with 3 Commando Brigade undertake the All Arms Commando Course, completion of which allows individuals to wear the headdress. Commando-qualified Royal Marines always wear the green beret, with the Globe and Laurel cap badge and commando-qualified personnel from other armed services wear the beret, with their own cap badge, when serving with commando units unless otherwise authorised. The Special Boat Service (SBS) also wear the green Commando beret but with their own cap badge consisting of a sword with two blue waved lines with the words "by strength and guile"

The Commando Badge of a Fairbairn-Sykes fighting knife on a triangular patch/badge is worn on the sleeve in perpetuity by all those who have passed the course.

Spanish Special Operations 

Army (Special Operations Command), Navy (Unidad de Operaciones Especiales) and Air Force of Spain have their own special operations units, all wearing green berets with the unit badges.

Personnel attached to the MCOE (Mando Conjunto de Operacionais Especiales) (Joint Special Operations Command) wear a green beret with the badge of the joint three military branches.

United States Army Special Forces

 
In the U.S. armed forces, the green beret may be worn only by soldiers awarded the Special Forces Tab, signifying they have been qualified as Special Forces (SF) soldiers. The Special Forces beret is officially designated "beret, man's, wool, rifle green, army shade 297".

U.S. Special Forces wear the green beret as a distinction of excellence and uniqueness within the Army.

The 10th Special Forces Group (Airborne) had many OSS World War II veterans in their ranks when it was formed in 1952. They began to unofficially wear a berets of varying colour while training. The color green became favored because it was reminiscent of the World War II British Commando-type beret. The 10th Special Forces Group (Airborne) deployed to Bad Tölz, Germany in September 1953. The remaining cadre at Fort Bragg formed the 77th Special Forces Group. Members of the 77th SFG began searching through their collections of berets and settled on the Rifle Green colour of the British Rifle Regiments (as opposed to the Lovat Green of the Commandos) from Captain Mike de la Pena's collection.  Captain Frank Dallas had the new beret designed and produced in small numbers for the members of the Special Forces.

Their new headdress was first worn at a retirement parade at Fort Bragg on 12 June 1955 for Lieutenant General Joseph P. Cleland, the now-former commander of the XVIII Airborne Corps. Onlookers thought that the commandos were a foreign delegation from NATO.

In 1956 General Paul D. Adams, the post commander at Fort Bragg, banned its wear, even though it was worn surreptitiously when deployed overseas. This was reversed on 25 September 1961 by Department of the Army Message 578636, which designated the green beret as the exclusive headdress of the Army Special Forces.

When visiting the Special Forces at Fort Bragg on 12 October 1961, President John F. Kennedy asked Brigadier General William P. Yarborough to make sure that the men under his command wore green berets for the visit. Later that day, Kennedy sent a memorandum which included the line: "I am sure that the green beret will be a mark of distinction in the trying times ahead".  By America's entry into the Vietnam War, the green beret had become a symbol of excellence throughout the US Army. On April 11, 1962 in a White House memorandum to the United States Army, President Kennedy reiterated his view: "The green beret is a symbol of excellence, a badge of courage, a mark of distinction in the fight for freedom". To no avail, both Yarborough and Edson Raff had previously petitioned the Pentagon to allow wearing of the green beret. The President, however, did not fail them.

In addition to being the headdress of the United States Army Special Forces, "Green Berets" is also a well known nickname of the organization.

Of historical note, an olive drab green beret was worn by arctic–qualified soldiers of the 172nd Infantry Brigade stationed in Alaska from 1973 to 1979 when the Department of the Army's morale-enhancing order was in force and various colored berets began to be worn by numerous units and branches of the US Army.

References

Further reading

Berets
Commandos